St Justinian (or St Justinian's or St Justinians; Welsh: Porth Stinan) is a coastal location of indeterminate area in the extreme northwest of Pembrokeshire, Wales, in the community of St Davids and the Cathedral Close.

Name
The area is named for Stinan (later Anglicised to Justinian), a 6th-7th century monk who was a contemporary of St David. Legend says that he was murdered by beheading and that his skull had miraculous properties.

Description
There is a small harbour, Porthstinan, housing the current St Davids Lifeboat Station, two former lifeboat stations and a private residence. The harbour is used for boat trips to Ramsey Island, and for kayaking and speedboat trips. It is a popular access point for the Pembrokeshire Coast Path.

History
St Justinian (as Sct. Stenans) appears on a 1578 parish map of Pembrokeshire.

Listed buildings
The ruined chapel of St Justinian is a Grade I listed building. The 1870s old lifeboat house, 1911 lifeboat house, an early 20th century watchtower and St Justinian's Well (a 19th-century stone enclosure over an ancient spring), are all Grade II listed.

Geography
The bay on which St Justinian stands is known as Porthstinian.

References

Geography of Pembrokeshire
St Davids